France participated in the Eurovision Song Contest 2018 with the song "Mercy" written by Émilie Satt and Jean-Karl Lucas. The song is performed by the French duo Madame Monsieur. The French entry for the 2018 contest in Lisbon, Portugal was selected through the national selection Destination Eurovision, organised by the French broadcaster France Télévisions in collaboration with the television channel France 2. The selection consisted of two semi-finals and a final. Madame Monsieur became the winner, placing third with the international juries but winning a landslide share of the vote from the French public, amassing enough points to win the competition. This was the first time France used a national final since 2014.

As a member of the "Big Five", France automatically qualified to compete in the final of the Eurovision Song Contest.

Background 

France first won the contest in 1958 with "Dors, mon amour" performed by André Claveau. In the 1960s, they won three times, with "Tom Pillibi" performed by Jacqueline Boyer in 1960, "Un premier amour" performed by Isabelle Aubret in 1962 and "Un jour, un enfant" performed by Frida Boccara, who won in 1969 in a four-way tie with the Netherlands, Spain and the United Kingdom. France's fifth victory came in 1977, when Marie Myriam won with the song "L'oiseau et l'enfant". France has also finished second four times, with Paule Desjardins in 1957, Catherine Ferry in 1976, Joëlle Ursull in 1990 and Amina in 1991, who lost out to Sweden's Carola in a tie-break. Since 2000, France has managed to place within the top ten four times, with Natasha St-Pier finishing fourth in 2001, Sandrine François finishing fifth in 2002, Patricia Kaas finishing eighth in 2009 and Amir finishing sixth in 2016. In 2017, France was represented by Alma and the song "Requiem". The country ended in twelfth place with 135 points.

The French national broadcaster, France Télévisions, broadcasts the event within France and delegates the selection of the nation's entry to the television channel France 2. The French broadcaster had used both national finals and internal selection to choose the French entry in the past. The 2014 French entry was selected via a national final that featured three competing acts. Since 2015, the broadcaster had opted to internally select the French entry. For their 2018 entry, it was announced on 21 June 2017 that the broadcaster would organise a national final.

Before Eurovision

Destination Eurovision
Destination Eurovision was the national final organised by France 2 to select France's entry for the Eurovision Song Contest 2018. The competition consisted of two semi-finals on 13 and 20 January 2018 and a final on 27 January 2018, all produced at the Studio Visual – Bât 210 in Saint-Denis and broadcast on France 2, TV5Monde and TV5 Québec Canada. All three shows in the competition were hosted by French-Canadian singer Garou.

Format
The format of the competition consisted of three shows: two pre-recorded semi-finals on 13 and 20 January 2018, and a live final on 27 January 2018. Nine entries competed in each semi-final, from which four were selected to advance to the final from each show. Results during the semi-finals were determined by the combination of votes from two jury groups: a three-member Francophone jury panel and a three-member international jury panel.

The Francophone jury panel consisted of:
 Amir – French singer, songwriter, represented France in the 2016 Contest (replaced by Alma during the final)
 Isabelle Boulay – French Canadian singer
 Christophe Willem – French singer

The international jury panel consisted of:
 Christer Björkman – Head of Delegation for Sweden at Eurovision, supervisor of Melodifestivalen
 Nicola Caligiore – Head of Delegation for Italy at Eurovision 
 Olga Salamakha – Head of Delegation for Belarus at Eurovision

Results in the final were determined by the combination of public televoting (50%) and a ten-member international jury panel (50%). The three international jury members in the semi-finals were joined by an additional seven members from Armenia, Bulgaria, Finland, Iceland, Israel, Russia and Switzerland. The public and the juries each had a total of 420 points to award, with each jury member awarding 2, 4, 6, 8, 10 and 12 points to their top six entries. The public vote was based on the percentage of votes each song achieved through telephone and SMS voting. For example, if a song gained 10% of the viewer vote, then that entry would be awarded 10% of 420 points rounded to the nearest integer: 42 points.

Competing entries
France 2 opened a submission period on 21 June 2017 in order for interested artists and songwriters to submit their proposals through an online submission form up until the deadline on 30 November 2017. Songs were required to contain at least 70% French language lyrics with a free language allowance for the remaining lyrics. In addition to the open submissions, France 2 also requested proposals from record companies. At the closing of the deadline, the French broadcaster received 1,500 submissions. A selection committee reviewed the received submissions and selected eighteen entries to compete in the national final. The competing artists and songs were announced gradually via social media from 29 December 2017 to 7 January 2018.

Shows

Semi-finals
Two pre-recorded semi-finals were held; the first semi-final was filmed on 8 January 2018 and aired on 13 January 2018, and the second semi-final was filmed on 9 January 2018 and aired on 20 January 2018. In each semi-final nine entries competed and four qualified to the final determined by the combination of votes from a three-member Francophone jury panel and a three-member international jury panel. In addition to performing their contest entry, each artist performed a cover version of a popular song.

Final
The final aired live on 27 January 2018. The four entries that qualified from the preceding two semi-finals competed and "Mercy" performed by Madame Monsieur was selected as the winner. In addition to performing their contest entry, each artist performed a duet with a well-known artist. Alma, who represented France in the 2017 Contest, replaced Amir in the Francophone jury panel who provided feedback to the competing artists.

Ratings

Promotion
Madame Monsieur made appearances across Europe to specifically promote "Mercy" as the French Eurovision entry. On 17 February 2018, they performed "Mercy" at the second semi-final of Vidbir 2018 in Ukraine. They also participated in the London Eurovision Party at the Café de Paris venue in London, United Kingdom on 5 April; Israel Calling at Rabin Square in Tel Aviv, Israel on 8–11 April; the Eurovision in Concert at the AFAS Live venue in Amsterdam, Netherlands on 14 April; and the Eurovision-Spain Pre-Party at the Sala La Riviera venue in Madrid, Spain on 21 April. For the Amsterdam event, 2018 United Kingdom representative SuRie performed the English version of the song alongside Jean-Karl Lucas as Satt was unable to travel due to illness.

At Eurovision 
The Eurovision Song Contest 2018 took place at the Altice Arena in Lisbon, Portugal and consisted of two semi-finals on 8 and 10 May and the final on 12 May 2018. According to Eurovision rules, all nations with the exceptions of the host country and the "Big Five" (France, Germany, Italy, Spain and the United Kingdom) were required to qualify from one of two semi-finals in order to compete for the final; the top ten countries from each semi-final progressed to the final. As a member of the "Big Five", France automatically qualified to compete in the final. In addition to their participation in the final, France was also required to broadcast and vote in one of the two semi-finals. During the semi-final allocation draw on 29 January 2018, France was assigned to broadcast and vote in the second semifinal on 10 May 2018. During the second press conference that took place on 6 May, Madame Monsieur took part in a draw to determine in which half of the final the French entry would be performed. France was drawn to compete in the first half.

Once all the competing songs for the 2018 contest had been released, the running order for the grand final was decided by the shows' producers rather than through another draw, so that similar songs were not placed next to each other. France was set to perform in position 13, following the entry from Albania and preceding the entry from the Czech Republic.

In France, the two semi-finals were broadcast on France 4 with commentary by André Manoukian and Christophe Willem, while the final was broadcast on France 2 with commentary by Stéphane Bern, Christophe Willem and 2017 French Eurovision representative Alma. The spokesperson announcing the French jury results was Élodie Gossuin.

Final
The performance featured Satt and Lucas dressed in black with red accents (the duo's shoes, Satt's makeup and Lucas's guitar). They started on the main stage surrounded by fog for the first verse and chorus before separating to walk across the two bridges on either side and joining back together on the satellite stage for the remainder of the song with the onstage lighting changing from blue to orange. On the final part of the song, the duo performed their signature hand motion with the entire audience in the arena joining in.

Offstage backing vocal support was provided by Allyson Ezell and Destination Eurovision semifinalist Noée.

Voting

Points awarded to France

Points awarded by France

Detailed voting results
The following members comprised the French jury:
 Cyril Taïeb (jury chairperson)artist
 Élodie Suigoradio host
  (Ehla)artist, singer
 Clémentine Boulardmusic and TV journalist
 Benjamin Marcianoartistic director

References

External links
 Official France 2 Eurovision site

2018
Countries in the Eurovision Song Contest 2018
Eurovision
Eurovision